Kothuru is a village in Rowthulapudi Mandal, Kakinada district in the state of Andhra Pradesh in India.

Geography 

Demographics 
 India census, Kothuru had a population of 271, out of which 127 were male and 144 were female. The population of children below 6 years of age was 16. The literacy rate of the village was 62.35%.

References 

Villages in Rowthulapudi mandal